Système U is a French symbol group retailers cooperative, comprising about eight hundred independent hypermarkets and supermarkets, headquartered in the Parc Tertiaire SILIC in Rungis, France.

It owns the trademarks Hyper U, Super U, Marché U and Utile, which are used by its members.  It had a pre-tax turnover of 12.7 billion euros in 2002 and 13.8 billion in 2003, rising to 15.6 billion euros in 2007; this makes the company the sixth largest retail group in France. 

It is directly descended from the Pain Quotidien ('daily bread') cooperative which was founded in western France in 1894.  It arranged a strategic alliance with the larger E.Leclerc supermarket group in 1999.

The sub-brands

There are four brands found within Système U:

The largest (in size terms) is the hypermarket Hyper U, which accounts for 15.89% of the group. There are 71 Hyper U stores, which account for a total of 239,293 square metres of retail space (at an average of 4,985 square metres per store). The average spend per trip is €43.60. These are generally found outside larger towns, but normally as stand-alone structures (rather than as part of a shopping centre)
The next brand down (in terms of size) is Super U  which accounts for 79.58% of the group. There are 773 Super U stores, which account for a total of 1,355,004 square metres of retail space (at an average of 2,016 square metres per store). The average spend per trip is €33.30. These are typical supermarkets, and are found either in the centre or on the outskirts of smaller towns. Again they exist as standalone structures.
Within city centres (and in rural areas), there are smaller stores known as U Express, which account for 4.53% of the group. There are 294 U Express stores, which account for a total of 104,468 square metres of retail space (at an average of 730 square metres per store). The average spend per trip is €17.00.
Utile are the smallest brand stores in Système U they are usually run as independent convenience stores. They are found mainly in small towns, village centers and on main road stops (Excluding dual carriageways and motorways) to occupy rural areas of France where people in rural areas can drive too at a short distance to get a few things quick. They usually do not accept Système U clubcards as the stores are run as independent.

Utile Marché is supermarket with 410 stores across France.

References

External links

 magasins u

Retailers' cooperatives
French companies established in 1894
Retail companies established in 1894
Cooperatives in France
Hypermarkets of France
Supermarkets of France